Big Cottonwood Canyon is a canyon in the Wasatch Range  southeast of Salt Lake City in the U.S. state of Utah. The -long canyon provides hiking, biking, picnicking, rock-climbing, camping, and fishing in the summer. Its two ski resorts, Brighton and Solitude, are popular among skiers and snowboarders. The canyon is accessed by The Big Cottonwood Canyon Scenic Byway (SR-190), which runs its length to Guardsman Pass at the top of the canyon, allowing travel to Park City in the summer months.

Guardsman Pass is closed during the winter months and is a popular snowshoe hiking destination for many Utahns.

Hiking to the canyon's mountain lakes is popular, with many trails leading to lakes such as Mary, Martha, and Katherine. The canyon's most popular hiking trail leads to Lakes Blanche, Florence and Lillian. Since the canyon was formed by Big Cottonwood Creek, the V-shaped canyon has many impressive rock forms.

The canyon is also a frequent destination for Utah Native Plant Society wildflower walks and for University of Utah botanical field trips. The canyon and the adjoining Little Cottonwood Canyon contain significant biodiversity and are home to a number of rare and endemic plant species. One example is the Wasatch shooting star, Dodecatheon dentatum var. utahense which is only known from Big Cottonwood Canyon.

Big Cottonwood Canyon is a watershed canyon that supplies drinking water to the Wasatch Front, therefore, pets and other domesticated animals are not allowed. In November 2011, a proposal to construct a gondola linking Solitude Ski Resort through Big Cottonwood Canyon to the Canyons Resort in Summit County drew criticism over concerns about its potential effect on sensitive terrain and watershed impacts.

Parts of two little known slasher films, Berserker (1987) and Iced (1988), were shot in Big Cottonwood Canyon. Parts of How the Grinch Stole Christmas (2000) were filmed at Solitude Mountain Resort, in Big Cottonwood Canyon.

Storm Mountain
Storm Mountain is a popular picnic site. Over one hundred years ago, R.D. Maxfield Jr. carved out a home for himself and his family. It soon became a relaxing place for picnics. In the 1930s, the Civilian Conservation Corps built a small stage area for public events.

The Storm Mountain area is also notable geologically for its rhythmites (a sea-level sedimentary deposit that records the cycle of the tides) and cross-bedded sandstones.

S-Curve Area
S-Curve Area is a popular rock climbing area in Big Cottonwood Canyon. Most of the routes are bolted and offer a variety of grades. Most distinctive about this climbing area is the impressive overhangs that exist on many of the routes. The S-Curve Area is located just  from the mouth of the canyon.

Gallery

See also
 Big Cottonwood Creek
 Stairs Station Hydroelectric Power Plant Historic District and Granite Hydroelectric Power Plant Historic District, both in the canyon

References
Big Cottonwood Canyon Scenic Byway. Utah.com
Big Cottonwood Canyon Hiking Trails. Utah Outdoor Activities
Trails - Big Cottonwood Canyon. Salt Lake Ranger District - USDA Forest Service.
https://web.archive.org/web/20061011150938/http://www.byways.org/browse/byways/2004/overview.html

Sources

External links

Big Cottonwood Canyon. Utah Pictures.

Canyons and gorges of Utah
Canyons and gorges of Salt Lake County, Utah
Civilian Conservation Corps in Utah
Tourist attractions in Salt Lake County, Utah
Wasatch Range
Protected areas of Salt Lake County, Utah
Wasatch-Cache National Forest